Mont-Saint-Hilaire is a suburb of Montreal on the South Shore of southeastern Quebec, Canada, on the Richelieu River in the Regional County Municipality of La Vallée-du-Richelieu. The population as of the Canada 2011 Census was 18,200. The city is named after the Mont Saint-Hilaire.

A significant deposit of the semi-precious mineral sodalite is located near Mont-Saint-Hilaire.

History
Jean-Baptiste Hertel de Rouville was granted the seignory of the region in 1694.  By 1745 a mountain village had been formed with the first chapel being built in 1798 near the Richelieu River. Nearly twenty years later, in 1822, a ferry operating between Beloeil and Mont-Saint-Hilaire came into service. A bridge, enabling Beloeil and St. Hilaire to be connected by rail, was built in 1848 by the St. Lawrence and Atlantic Railway. The Campbell family, owners of the mountain after that of Rouville, sold the mountain to a British officer, Brigadier-General Andrew Gault, in whose ownership it remained for 45 years. Gault then bequeathed the mountain to McGill University before his death in 1958.

Demographics 

Population trend:

Mother tongue language (2006)

Transportation
Mont-Saint-Hilaire is served by the Mont-Saint-Hilaire commuter rail station on the Réseau de transport métropolitain's (RTM) Mont-Saint-Hilaire line. Local bus service is provided by the RTM's Vallée du Richelieu sector.

In 1864, Canada's worst rail disaster occurred here when a passenger train passed a red signal and fell off an open swing bridge into the Richelieu River, killing around 99 people.

Attractions

The Gault Nature Reserve on Mont Saint-Hilaire includes over a thousand hectares of primeval forest. Owned by McGill University, the nature reserve  is used for research and recreation.
The Museum of Fine Arts (Le Musée des beaux-arts) of Mont-Saint-Hilaire is the major art museum on the south shore of the Saint Lawrence River. It was founded in 1993 to promote the work of regional artists Jordi Bonet, Paul-Émile Borduas and Ozias Leduc. Exhibitions also feature art from the area, such as Saint-Hilaire et les Automatistes in 1997, and Leduc, Borduas et le paysage de Saint-Hilaire in 2008, as well as other Quebec artists such as Jean-Paul Lemieux and Nancy Petry.
Art Station
Art centre Ozias Leduc
Manoir Rouville-Campbell
Saint-Hilaire church

Photo gallery

Education

The town is home to 4 primary schools: Au-fil-de-l'eau (659 pupils), de l'Aquarelle (354 pupils) and de la Pommeraie (383 pupils) and Paul-Émile-Borduas. There are also 2 secondary schools, including Ozias-Leduc, with 1,480 studentsand Collège Saint-Hilaire, a private high school that receives students from the region.

The South Shore Protestant Regional School Board previously served the municipality.

Notable residents
 Laurent Duvernay-Tardif, American football player for the New York Jets of the National Football League
 Louis Domingue, ice hockey player for the Calgary Flames

See also
List of cities in Quebec
St-Hilaire train disaster
Jordi-Bonet Bridge

References

External links

Town of Mont-Saint-Hilaire

Cities and towns in Quebec
Incorporated places in La Vallée-du-Richelieu Regional County Municipality
Greater Montreal